Greenway Historic District is a national historic district located near Boyce, Clarke County, Virginia. It encompasses 432 contributing buildings, 23 contributing sites, and 35 contributing structures.  The districts includes the agricultural landscape and architectural resources of an area distinctively rural that contains numerous large antebellum estates. The district contributing buildings are primarily farm and estate residences and their associated outbuildings.  Other contributing buildings include three schools, five churches, two mills, a gas station, a restaurant, and a railroad station. The contributing structures are mostly corncribs and the contributing sites are mainly cemeteries and ruins of historic buildings.  The district contains ten individual properties and two historic districts already listed on the Virginia Landmarks Register and National Register of Historic Places.

It was listed on the National Register of Historic Places in 1993, with boundary increases in 1997 and 2007.

Gallery

References

Historic districts on the National Register of Historic Places in Virginia
Buildings and structures in Clarke County, Virginia
National Register of Historic Places in Clarke County, Virginia